Elias Mendes Trindade (born 16 May 1985), known simply as Elias, is a Brazilian former professional footballer who played as a central midfielder.

Career

Early career
Born in São Paulo, Elias was a Palmeiras youth graduate, and played as a forward at the club. In December 2005, after a short stint at Verdãos B-team, he signed for Náutico.

Elias made his debut for Timbu on 15 January 2006, starting in a 1–0 Campeonato Pernambucano away loss against Serrano. On 20 January, after just one further match, he was released.

Elias spent the rest of the 2006 season playing for amateur sides Leões da Geolândia and Estrela Vermelha, and subsequently joined São Bento for the 2007 season, where he moved back to a midfielder role and impressed for the club. In that year he also represented Juventus-SP, scoring one of the goals in the club's 2–3 loss against Linense in the second leg of the Copa Paulista Finals, which his side won after a 4–4 aggregate result.

On 4 December 2007, Elias agreed to a contract with Ponte Preta in the Série B. He made his debut for the club the following 16 January by starting and scoring his team's third in a 4–2 home win against Ituano, and was a regular starter in the 2008 Campeonato Paulista which his side reached the Finals.

Corinthians
On 8 May 2008, Elias signed a contract with fellow second division side Corinthians until December 2011. An immediate starter, he helped the club return to Série A in his first season, and was a key unit in the club's 2009 Campeonato Paulista winning campaign.

Elias made his top tier debut on 6 August 2009, starting in a 1–0 loss at his former club Náutico. He scored his first goal in the category on 27 August, netting his team's second in a 2–2 away draw against Grêmio Barueri.

Atlético Madrid
On 5 December 2010, Elias confirmed that he would leave Corinthians and join Spanish team Atlético Madrid in January 2011, for a rumoured fee of €7 million. The club confirmed the transfer on 16 December, and made his debut abroad on 17 January, starting in a 3–0 home win against RCD Mallorca.

Elias scored his first goal abroad on 2 March 2011, netting the equalizer in a 1–1 draw at Getafe CF.

Sporting CP
On 29 August 2011, after being deemed surplus to requirements at Atleti, Elias moved to Sporting CP on a five-year contract. The club paid a fee of €8.85 million, making this the highest paid transfer in SCP history at the time. On 15 September, Sporting sold 50% economic rights of Elias for €3.85 million to Quality Sports Investments.

On his debut, on 10 September 2011, Elias scored a goal against F.C. Paços de Ferreira, on a win (2–3) of Sporting. At the 76th minute, Sporting was losing by 2–0, but with the goals by Marat Izmailov, Elias and Ricky van Wolfswinkel, Sporting won and began a series of victories in the league, earning him the nickname of "The Prophet" amidst Sporting fans. He scored again on 18 December, in a 1–1 draw against Académica, being subsequently sent off in that match.

Flamengo (loan)
On 10 January 2013, Elias joined Brazilian side Flamengo on loan for the season. He made his debut on 27 January by replacing Renato Abreu in a 1–0 home win against Volta Redonda, and scored his first goal on 14 March in a 3–2 home loss against Resende.

Elias was a regular starter during his loan spell, with Flamengo attempting to keep the midfielder for the 2014 campaign, but the move did not materialize.

Return to Corinthians
On 7 April 2014, and after two months of negotiations, Elias returned to Corinthians, who paid €4 million for 50% of his economic rights. He was presented on 10 April, and signed a contract until December 2017.

A regular starter upon arriving, Elias subsequently lost his undisputed status but still appeared regularly.

Sporting CP return
On 31 August 2016, Elias returned to Portugal and Sporting, signing a two-year contract, with a buyout clause of €60 million. However, he was sparingly used by the Lions, scoring twice in 13 appearances overall.

Atlético Mineiro
On 27 January 2017, Atlético Mineiro announced the signing of Elias. He featured regularly for the side during his spell, but was released on 7 January 2020, one month earlier than the expiry of his contract.

International career
On 23 September 2010, Elias was first called up to the Brazil national team by coach Mano Menezes. He made his full international debut on 7 October, replacing Philippe Coutinho in a 3–0 win over Iran.

Elias was also included in Mano's 23-man list for the 2011 Copa América, while also featuring in Dunga's list for the 2015 Copa América and in the Copa América Centenario.

Career statistics

Club

International

Honours

Club
Juventus
 Copa Paulista: 2007

Corinthians
 Campeonato Brasileiro Série B: 2008
 Campeonato Paulista: 2009
 Copa do Brasil: 2009
 Campeonato Brasileiro Série A: 2015

Flamengo
 Copa do Brasil: 2013

Atlético Mineiro
 Campeonato Mineiro: 2017

International
Brazil
 Superclásico de las Américas: 2014

Individual
 Campeonato Brasileiro Série A Team of the Year: 2010, 2013, 2015

References

External links
 
 
 
 

1985 births
Living people
Footballers from São Paulo
Brazilian footballers
Association football midfielders
Campeonato Brasileiro Série A players
Campeonato Brasileiro Série B players
Campeonato Brasileiro Série C players
Sociedade Esportiva Palmeiras players
Clube Náutico Capibaribe players
Esporte Clube São Bento players
Clube Atlético Juventus players
Associação Atlética Ponte Preta players
Sport Club Corinthians Paulista players
CR Flamengo footballers
Clube Atlético Mineiro players
La Liga players
Atlético Madrid footballers
Primeira Liga players
Sporting CP footballers
2011 Copa América players
2015 Copa América players
Copa América Centenario players
Brazil international footballers
Brazilian expatriate footballers
Brazilian expatriate sportspeople in Portugal
Brazilian expatriate sportspeople in Spain
Expatriate footballers in Portugal
Expatriate footballers in Spain